Pádraig Kelly is a former Irish sportsperson. He played hurling with the Galway senior inter-county team.
He scored two points in the 1993 All-Ireland Senior Hurling Championship Final defeat against Kilkenny and won an All Star award in 1993, being picked in the left half back position.

References

External links
GAA Info Profile

Living people
Galway inter-county hurlers
Year of birth missing (living people)